Guillaume Metten (19 July 1938 - 13 November 2020) is a senior former Belgian diplomat and Belgian ambassador to Iran, India, Nepal, Bhutan, Sri Lanka, the Maldives, Morocco and Mauritania.
At present he is vice president of European Institute for International Law and International Relations. 
He is one of seven EU ambassadors signed for the right of Iran to possess the nuclear technology for pacific purpose in 2011, This piece was written and signed by seven former ambassadors to Iran from European countries: Richard Dalton United Kingdom, Steen Hohwü-Christensen Sweden, Paul von Maltzahn Germany, Guillaume Metten Belgium, François Nicoullaud France and Roberto Toscano Italy.

Diplomatic career 
 He joined the Belgian diplomacy in 1965. 
 1967, he was named Attaché at the Brazzaville Embassy, a charge he occupied until 1970. 
 He passed another commercial examination from the central Belgian administration and became Secretary in the Ankara Embassy between 1971 and 1972. 
 He was appointed First Secretary of the Kigali Embassy in 1972 and kept this position until 1975,  
 Designated counselor in the office of the Minister for Cooperation and Development. He left  the Ministry in 1977 to be named counsellor in Warsaw (until 1980) and then Minister-Counsellor in Tokyo (1981 – 1982).
 In 1982 he became Deputy Chief of Staff of Leo Tindemans Minister for External Relations, and occupied this position until 1985. 
 In 1985 he was designated Ambassador in Dakar, with responsibility for seven Western African countries. He left this position in 1989. 
 Appointed Ambassador in Rabat and stayed in the capital until 1992, with Morocco and Mauritania under its responsibility. 
 He was chief for field staff in the central administration between 1992 and 1995, 
 Ambassador in New Delhi (1995 – 1999), with India, Nepal, Bhutan, Sri Lanka and the Maldives under its jurisdiction. 
 At the end, he became ambassador in Tehran (Iran) between 1999 and 2003, before retiring from the Belgian diplomacy.
 He was promoted at the Administrative First Class 1 October 2001.

Post retirement 
 Following his retirement from the Belgian diplomacy in 2010, Guillaume Metten concentrated on Iranian, the Middle East and North African through his contributions to conferences and written papers.
 At present he is the director of the department researches of international relations at The European Institute for International Law and International Relations.

References 

 Guillaume Metten - Official website of The European Institute for International Law and International Relations
 BBC
 Los Angeles Times
 The Indian Express
 National Centre for Trade Information
 Guillaume Metten | The Globe and Mail
 Guillaume Metten | French Journal Le Monde
 Guillaume Metten | BASIC - British American Security Information Council
 Official website of The European Institute for International Law and International Relations

External links 
 Official website of The European Institute for International Law and International Relations

Ambassadors of Belgium to Bhutan
Ambassadors of Belgium to India
Ambassadors of Belgium to Iran
Ambassadors of Belgium to the Maldives
Ambassadors of Belgium to Mauritania
Ambassadors of Belgium to Morocco
Ambassadors of Belgium to Nepal
Ambassadors of Belgium to Senegal
Ambassadors of Belgium to Sri Lanka
Belgian diplomats
1938 births
2020 deaths